For the main article, please see Blackgaze.

 Agalloch
 Alcest
 A Light In The Dark
 Altar of Plagues
 Amesoeurs
 An Autumn for Crippled Children
 Bosse-de-Nage
 Chagrin
 Deafheaven
 Fen
 Ghost Bath
 Karg
 MØL
 Oathbreaker
 Unreqvited
 Vaura
 Wolves in the Throne Room
 Zeal & Ardor

References 

 
Lists of black metal bands